Philip Blake (born 1985) is a Canadian football player.

Philip or Phillip Blake may also refer to:

The Governor (The Walking Dead), whose name was thought to be Philip Blake
Phil Blake (born 1964), Australian former rugby league footballer
Phillip Blake, fictional character in the novel Five Little Pigs